The Canadair CT-133 Silver Star (company model number CL-30) is the Canadian license-built version of the Lockheed T-33 jet trainer aircraft, in service from the 1950s to 2005. The Canadian version was powered by the Rolls-Royce Nene 10 turbojet, whereas the Lockheed production used the Allison J33.

Design and development
The Canadair CT-133 was the result of a 1951 contract to build T-33 Shooting Star trainers for the Royal Canadian Air Force (RCAF). The powerplant is a Rolls-Royce Nene 10 turbojet instead of the Allison J33 used by Lockheed in the production of the original T-33. A project designation of CL-30 was given by Canadair and the name was changed to Silver Star. The appearance of the CT-133 is very distinctive due to the large fuel tanks usually carried on each wingtip.

A total of 656 CT-133 aircraft were built by Canadair.

Operational history

The CT-133 entered service in the RCAF as its primary training aircraft for fighter/interceptors. The designation of the Silver Star in the Canadian Forces was CT-133.

The CT-133's service life in the RCAF (and later the Canadian Forces) was extremely long. One of the more unusual roles it played was as an aerobatic demonstration aircraft, the RCAF's Red Knight. Although the aircraft stopped being used as a trainer in 1976, there were still over 50 aircraft in Canadian Forces inventory in 1995. The youngest of these airframes was then 37 years old and had exceeded its expected life by a factor of 2.5. During this period, the Canadair T-33 was employed in communication, target towing, and enemy simulation.

The final Canadair Silver Star Mk. 3 was retired from the Aerospace Engineering Test Establishment at CFB Cold Lake, Alberta, Canada, where it was used as an ejection seat testbed after 46 years of service. CT-133 number 133648 was delivered to CFD Mountain View on 26 April 2005. Having been built in March 1959 as a CT-133 with original RCAF serial number 21648, it had reached a total of  flight hours at the time of its retirement from military use. It has been sold on the civil market, along with fifteen other CT-133s. These aircraft will join the fifty others on the United States Civil Register and continue to fly as a part of the living legacy of the early jet age.

Variants

T-33A Silver Star Mk 1: Two-seat jet training aircraft for the RCAF. Built by Lockheed in the United States, 30 on loan to the RCAF.
CT-133ANX Silver Star Mk 2: The first Canadian prototype. One built.
: Two-seat jet training aircraft for the RCAF.
Silver Star Mk 3PT: Unarmed version.
Silver Star Mk 3AT: Armed version, two Browning .50 caliber machine guns in nose and underwing pylons for 1,000 lb bombs and HVAR rockets.
Silver Star Mk 3PR: Photo-reconnaissance version.
CE-133: Upgraded electronic warfare training aircraft.
CX-133: Ejection seat testbed.
ET-133: Aerial threat simulator aircraft.
TE-133: Anti-ship threat simulator aircraft.

Operators
Bolivia
Bolivian Air Force – 20 AT-33A-Ns (former Canadian Forces)
Canada
Royal Canadian Air Force
 Red Knight (aerobatic team)
Royal Canadian Navy
Canadian Forces
National Research Council
France
French Air Force delivered between 1959 and 1962
Greece
Hellenic Air Force (former RCAF aircraft)
Portugal
Portuguese Air Force
Turkey
Turkish Air Force

Aircraft on display
The following locations have CT-133 Silver Stars on display or in flyable condition:

Alberta
21081 is near Airdrie, Alberta, in the yard of a private owner.
There are approximately 7 CT-133's either on display or in storage at CFB Cold Lake.
21072 is displayed at CFB Edmonton.
21506 and 21533 are in possession of the Alberta Aviation Museum in Edmonton, Alberta.
21097 is mounted on a pylon in Edson, Alberta.
21518 is on display in Leduc, Alberta.
21578 is outside the Royal Canadian Legion in Lethbridge, Alberta.
21272 is on a pylon outside the building of the Bomber Command Museum of Canada in Nanton, Alberta.
21437 resides on a pedestal at Rocky Mountain House, Alberta.
21271 is outside the Royal Canadian Legion in St. Albert, Alberta.
CT-133 given serial number 133419 is located in Warner, Alberta.
21089 and 21351 are at the Reynolds-Alberta Museum in Wetaskiwin, Alberta.
British Columbia
Canadian Museum of Flight
Comox Air Force Museum

Manitoba
Gimli
 Winnipeg Air Force Heritage Museum and Park

Nova Scotia
Atlantic Canada Aviation Museum
Greenwood Military Aviation Museum Greenwood, Nova Scotia
Shearwater Aviation Museum

Ontario
Canadian Air and Space Museum
Canada Aviation Museum
Canadian Historical Aircraft Association
Canadian Warplane Heritage Museum
Fort Erie - Sugarbowl Park
Jet Aircraft Museum – two operational examples
London International Airport
National Air Force Museum of Canada

Quebec
Canadian Forces Base Bagotville
Val-d'Or

United Kingdom
RAF Manston History Museum, at RAF Manston, Kent, England
Yorkshire Air Museum, at RAF Elvington, England

Surviving aircraft

Canada
Jet Aircraft Museum – two operational examples
Waterloo Warbirds - one operational example

United States
Airworthy
CT-133
 RCAF s/n 21024 - privately owned in Scottsdale, Arizona.
 RCAF s/n 21052 (CF s/n 133052) - privately owned in Mobile, Alabama.
 RCAF s/n 21098 - privately owned in Waller, Texas.
 RCAF s/n 21129 - privately owned in Salt Lake City, Utah.
 RCAF s/n 21157 - privately owned in Houston, Texas.
 RCAF s/n 21159 - privately owned in Belgrade, Montana.
 RCAF s/n 21165 (CF s/n 133165) - Vintage Flying Museum in Fort Worth, Texas.
 RCAF s/n 21192 - privately owned in Guthrie, Oklahoma.
 RCAF s/n 21298 - operated by Boeing Aircraft  in Seattle, Washington.
 RCAF s/n 21306 - privately owned in San Rafael, California.
 RCAF s/n 21369 - operated by Boeing Aircraft in Seattle, Washington.
 RCAF s/n 21375 - privately owned in Santa Fe, New Mexico.
 RCAF s/n 21377 (CF s/n 133377) - Planes of Fame in Chino, California.
 RCAF s/n 21440 - privately owned in Delanson, New York.
 RCAF s/n 21456 - privately owned in Brigham City, Utah.
 RCAF s/n 21467 (CF s/n 133467) - privately owned in Litchfield Park, Arizona.
 RCAF s/n 21479 (CF s/n 133479) - privately owned in Bulverde, Texas.
 RCAF s/n 21504 (CF s/n 133504) - privately owned in Scottsdale, Arizona.
 RCAF s/n 21556 - privately owned in Chicago, Illinois.
 RCAF s/n 21557 (CF s/n 133557) - privately owned in Mesa, Arizona.
 RCAF s/n 21559 - privately owned in Parowan, Utah.
 RCAF s/n 21566 - Tennessee Museum of Aviation in Luttrell, Tennessee.
 RCAF s/n 21579 (CF s/n 133579) - privately owned in Oconomowoc, Wisconsin.
 RCAF s/n 21582 - War Eagles Air Museum in Santa Teresa, New Mexico.
 RCAF s/n 21590 (CF s/n 133590) - privately owned in Carson City, Nevada.
 RCAF s/n 21604 (CF s/n 133604) - privately owned in Jurupa Valley, California.
 CF s/n 133452 - privately owned in San Rafael, California.
 CF s/n 133610 - privately owned in San Rafael, California.
 CF s/n 133564 - privately owned in San Antonio, Texas.

Under restoration
CT-133
 RCAF s/n 21483 (CF s/n 133483) - to airworthiness by private owner in Houston, Texas.
 RCAF s/n 21560 (CF s/n 133560) - to airworthiness by private owner in Houston, Texas.
 RCAF s/n 21571 (CF s/n 133571) - to airworthiness by private owner in Houston, Texas. 
 RCAF s/n 21613 (CF s/n 133613) - to airworthiness by private owner in Ione, California.
 RCAF s/n 21615 (CF s/n 133615) - to airworthiness by private owner in Jordan Valley, Oregon.
 CF s/n 133083 - to airworthiness the Military Aircraft Restoration Corporation in Anaheim, California.

Specifications (CT-133)

See also

References
Notes

Bibliography

"Canada's Fab Four". Air Forces Monthly. Stamford, Lincolnshire, UK: Key Publishing Limited, August 2003. ISSN 0955-7091.
Flight Comment: The Canadian Forces Flight Safety Magazine. Ottawa: Publishing and Depository Services, Summer 2005. ISSN 0015-3702, .
Andrade, John: Militair 1982. London: 1982. 
Francillon, René. Lockheed Aircraft Since 1913. London: Putnam, 1982. .
Pickler, Ron and Larry Milberry. Canadair: The First 50 Years. Toronto: Canav Books, 1995. .
"Silver Star Stand Down". Air Classics April 2006, Canoga Park, California: Challenge Publications. ISSN 0002-2241.

External links

Canadian Forces CT-133 Silver Star page

CT-133
1950s Canadian military trainer aircraft
Single-engined jet aircraft
Aircraft first flown in 1952
Low-wing aircraft